Albion Ademi (born 19 February 1999) is a professional footballer who plays for  Swedish club Djurgården as a winger. Born in Kosovo, he moved to Finland at an early age and represented the country at youth level before switching allegiance to Albania.

Club career
Ademi has played for TPS, Inter Turku, EIF and PS Kemi.

On 30 December 2019, Ademi signed a one-year contract with IFK Mariehamn.

He moved to Swedish club Djurgården in January 2021. On 25 March 2022, Ademi joined Lahti on loan until mid-July 2022.

International career
Ademi represented Finland at under-17 and under-19 youth levels. With the under-19 squad, he played two games at the 2018 UEFA European Under-19 Championship, which Finland hosted.

On 31 August 2018, Ademi received a call-up from the Albania U21 national team for a friendly match against Italy U21 and made his debut after being named in the starting line-up.

On 5 October 2018, Ademi received a call-up from Albania U21 for the 2019 UEFA European Under-21 Championship qualification matches against Spain U21 and Estonia U21. He joined up with the team however was unable to play due to him having to wait for FIFA's permission.

In November 2018, he received his first call-up to the senior Albania national football team for UEFA Nations League game against Scotland and a friendly against Wales, but remained on the bench in both games.

Personal life
Ademi is of Kosovo Albanian descent.

Career statistics

References

1999 births
Living people
Footballers from Turku
Finnish people of Kosovan descent
Finnish people of Albanian descent
Association football wingers
Albanian men's footballers
Albania under-21 international footballers
Finnish footballers
Finland youth international footballers
Turun Palloseura footballers
FC Inter Turku players
Ekenäs IF players
IFK Mariehamn players
Djurgårdens IF Fotboll players
Kemi City F.C. players
FC Lahti players
Veikkausliiga players
Ykkönen players
Finnish expatriate footballers
Finnish expatriate sportspeople in Sweden
Albanian expatriate footballers
Albanian expatriate sportspeople in Sweden
Expatriate footballers in Sweden